Apocalypse Dudes is the fourth album by the Norwegian band Turbonegro. It is the first studio album with Euroboy as the lead guitarist and the last before the band disbanded in December 1998. Released in early 1998 in Norway and Germany, the album was a huge success for the then underground band.

Adapting a more glam rock-oriented sound, Apocalypse Dudes set the standard for future Turbonegro records and became the first part of the Apocalypse trilogy, consisting of Apocalypse Dudes (1998), Scandinavian Leather (2003) and Party Animals (2005).

Production 
Following the addition of Euroboy and the drummer Chris Summers, Turbonegro had adapted a new sound with the release of their "Prince of the Rodeo" single, gradually moving from punk rock to glam rock. The band went into the studio in late 1997, after extensive touring. The band originally planned to release an EP including the songs "Get It On", "Zillion Dollar Sadist" and a cover of David Bowie's "Suffragette City". But as they wrote more songs, they decided to record an album instead.

While its predecessor, Ass Cobra, was an all-out punk rock record, Apocalypse Dudes adds a more produced, rock-oriented sound characterized by a wall of guitars and blistering solos. "The Age of Pamparius" starts out with an ascending guitar solo over piano and acoustic guitar, reminiscent of Alice Cooper, before fading into a myriad of synth noises and a whispering voice introducing the album. A plucked guitar riff is then played before the song erupts into fast-paced glam rock. "Get It On" is introduced by thundering drums and a guitar riff in the style of The Dictators. "Rock Against Ass" and "Don't Say Motherfucker, Motherfucker" contains elements of pop rock. "Prince of the Rodeo" features conga drums while "Humiliation Street" is a dark ballad, ending with an extended guitar solo. The album's final song, "Good Head", is a cover version of the song by Schreiner and Seltzer's earlier garage rock band, The Vikings.

Hank von Helvete struggled with heroin addiction during the recording process and almost quit the band. The vocals for "Are You Ready (For Some Darkness)" took several days to record due to his poor health.

Turbonegro finished the recording in late 1997 and signed a contract with Virgin Records to release the album. The album was released 23 February 1998.

Release 
Apocalypse Dudes was released on Virgin Records on CD in Norway, on Boomba Records on 12" vinyl and CD in Germany, on Bitzcore Records on 12" vinyl in Germany and on Man's Ruin/Sympathy for the Record Industry on 12" vinyl and CD on 26 January 1999, in the United States. It was re-released on 27 January 2003, on Burning Heart Records in Sweden and on Epitaph Records in the USA. It went gold in Norway.

Apocalypse Dudes presents Turbonegro's trademark deathpunk sound, "a new resurgence of glam rock'n'roll" as the Boomba announcement put it - much due to guitarist Euroboy, who had been playing with the band live since 1996.

Moshable magazine commented, "Apocalypse Dudes is the perfect mix of classic 70's US punk / rock'n'roll like The Dictators, The Heartbreakers & The Ramones... every tune on this release is fucking brilliant." Jello Biafra was quoted as saying, "The new Turbonegro record is possibly the most important European record ever."

The original Boomba announcement from April 1998 said, "This my friends, is a virtually perfect record! Excellent production - a huge, FAT sound; lots of power and excellent songs that you can't get out of your head. Not one let down through 47 minutes of music!! This is not an underground tip !! 'Apocalypse Dudes' appeals to the masses. From punk to metal to mainstream, "Apocalypse Dudes" has something for everyone."

Pitchfork rated Apocalypse Dudes 8.6 out of 10. Punk News rated it four and a half stars out of five.

Legacy 
 The track "Age of Pamparius" is used as the theme for MTV's Wildboyz.
 The album is listed in 1001 Albums You Must Hear Before You Die.
 The tracks "Selfdestructo Bust" and "Prince of the Rodeo" were used in Jackass: The Game.
 The song "Get It On" was used in season 3 episode 13 of the TV show Sons of Anarchy.

Track listing

Personnel
 Hank von Helvete (Hans Erik Dyvik Husby) - vocals
 Euroboy (Knut Schreiner) - lead guitar
 Rune Rebellion (Rune Grønn) - rhythm guitar
 Pål Pot Pamparius (Pål Bøttger Kjærnes) - keyboards and percussion
 Happy-Tom (Thomas Seltzer) - bass
 Chris Summers (Christer Engen) - drums

Additional personnel 
 Martin Anderson - photography
 Oliver Brand - director
 Christian A. Calmeyer - engineer
 Rocco Clein - director
 Dimitri 'from Oslo' Kayiambakis - artwork
 Marco Finger - photography
 Pal Klaastad - engineer

References 

Turbonegro albums
1998 albums
Burning Heart Records albums
Man's Ruin Records albums
Sympathy for the Record Industry albums